Ferham Park was a cricket ground in Rotherham, Yorkshire, England.  The first recorded match on the ground was in 1880, when the North played a United South of England Eleven, in what was the ground's only first-class match.  The final recorded match on the ground saw Rotherham play Yorkshire in 1914.  The ground was later built on.

References

External links
Ferham Park on CricketArchive
Ferham Park on Cricinfo

Defunct cricket grounds in England
Cricket grounds in South Yorkshire
Sports venues in Rotherham
Defunct sports venues in South Yorkshire
Sports venues completed in 1869
1869 establishments in England